Koch Industries, Inc. is an American privately held multinational conglomerate corporation based in Wichita, Kansas and is the second-largest privately held company in the United States, after Cargill. Its subsidiaries are involved in the manufacturing, refining, and distribution of petroleum, chemicals, energy, fiber, intermediates and polymers, minerals, fertilizer, pulp and paper, chemical technology equipment, cloud computing, finance, raw materials trading, and investments. Koch owns Flint Hills Resources, Georgia-Pacific, Guardian Industries, Infor, Invista, KBX, Koch Ag & Energy Solutions, Koch Engineered Solutions, Koch Investments Group, Koch Minerals & Trading, and Molex. The firm employs 122,000 people in 60 countries, with about half of its business in the United States.

The company was founded by its namesake, Fred C. Koch, in 1940 after he developed an innovative crude oil refining process. Fred C. Koch died in 1967 and his majority interest in the company was split amongst his four sons. In June 1983, after a bitter legal and boardroom battle over the amount of dividends paid by the company, the stakes of Frederick R. Koch and William "Bill" Koch were bought out for $1.1 billion and Charles Koch and David Koch became majority owners in the company. Charles owns 42% of the company; trusts for the benefit of Elaine Tettemer Marshall (the daughter in-law of J. Howard Marshall) and Elaine's children, Preston Marshall and E. Pierce Marshall Jr., own 16% of the company. David Koch died on August 23, 2019 and his heirs own the remaining 42% balance of the corporation.

Charles Koch has stated that the company would go public "over my dead body" and that the company has used its freedom from the pressures of public markets to make long-term investments and concentrate on growth.

History

Predecessor companies
In 1925, Fred C. Koch joined MIT classmate Lewis E. Winkler at an engineering firm in Wichita, Kansas, which was renamed the Winkler-Koch Engineering Company. In 1927, they developed a more efficient thermal cracking process for turning crude oil into gasoline. This process, which the company sold to many independent refineries in the United States, threatened the competitive advantage of established oil companies, which sued for patent infringement.  Temporarily forced out of business in the United States, they turned to other markets, including the Soviet Union, where Winkler-Koch built 15 cracking units between 1929 and 1932. During this time, Koch came to despise communism and Joseph Stalin's regime. In his 1960 book, A Business Man Looks at Communism, Koch wrote that he found the USSR to be "a land of hunger, misery, and terror". According to Charles Koch, "Virtually every engineer he worked with [there] was purged."

Winkler-Koch built refineries in Germany in the early 1930s. In a joint venture with William Rhodes Davis, Koch assisted in the design and construction of the third-largest oil refinery in Germany at the time. It was also one of the few refineries capable of refining fuel for airplanes, and was a strategic bombing target for Allied forces. The project was stalled for some time as Davis sought approval, before it was approved personally by Adolf Hitler.

In 1940, Koch joined new partners to create the Wood River Oil and Refining Company. In 1946, the firm acquired the Rock Island refinery and crude oil gathering system near Duncan, Oklahoma. Wood River was later renamed the Rock Island Oil & Refining Company. Charles Koch joined Rock Island in 1961, having started his career at the management consulting firm Arthur D. Little. He became president in 1966 and chairman at age 32, upon his father's death the following year.

Koch Industries
Wood River Oil and Refining Company was renamed Koch Industries in 1968 in honor of Fred Koch, the year after his death. At that time, it was primarily an engineering firm with a 35% interest in Great Northern Oil Company, which owned the Pine Bend Refinery in Minnesota, a crude oil-gathering system in Oklahoma, and some cattle ranches.

In 1968, Charles approached Union Oil of California about buying its 40% interest in Great Northern Oil Company but the discussions quickly stalled after Union asked for a large premium. In 1969, Koch merged his interest with the 15% interest owned by J. Howard Marshall, then owning a combined 50% of the company, preventing Union from assembling a controlling interest. They then acquired Union's interest. The Pine Bend Refinery produced chemicals, fibers, polymers, asphalt and other commodities such as petroleum coke and sulfur.

In 1970, Charles was joined at the family firm by his brother David Koch. Having started as a technical services manager, David became president of Koch Engineering in 1979.

In 1979, the company acquired 780 dealerships from Chrysler.

In June 1983, after a bitter legal and boardroom battle over the amount of dividends paid by the company, in a settlement, the stakes of William "Bill" Koch and Frederick R. Koch, who wanted the company to pay more dividends rather than reinvest in the business, were bought out for $620 million and $400 million, respectively, and Charles Koch and David Koch became majority owners in the company. In June 1985, William and Frederick unsuccessfully sued their brothers claiming that they were underpaid for their stakes.

In September 2001, the company acquired KoSa. This company is considered the largest producer of polyester in the world.

In 2005, the company acquired Georgia-Pacific.

In 2008, the company discovered that the French affiliate Koch-Glitsch had violated bribery laws allegedly securing contracts in Algeria, Egypt, India, Morocco, Nigeria and Saudi Arabia after an investigation by Ethics Compliance officer, Egorova-Farines. After Koch Industries' investigative team looked into her findings, the four employees involved were terminated. According to journalist Jennifer Rubin, Koch Industries' general counsel stated that Egorova-Farines failed to promptly share the findings, choosing instead to give the information to a manager at Koch-Glitsch who was later fired for bribery. According to Koch Industries' general counsel, "Egorova-Farines was not fired but instead ran into performance problems, left the company to go on leave and never returned." Egorova-Farines sued Koch-Glitsch for wrongful termination in France, lost, and "was ordered to pay costs for bringing a frivolous case".

In 2010, the company was among the first group of nearly 2,000 employers that applied for and were granted federal reimbursements from the U.S. Department of Health and Human Services, under the new Early Retiree Reinsurance Program established by the Patient Protection and Affordable Care Act, for providing health insurance to retirees too young to be eligible for Medicare.

In 2013, the company acquired Molex, a provider of electronic components, for $7.2 billion.

In September 2014, along with the private equity arm of Goldman Sachs, the company acquired Flint Group, a printing ink producer, for $3 billion.

In June 2014, the United Negro College Fund announced a $25 million grant from Koch Industries and the Charles Koch Foundation to go towards merit-based scholarships and general support of historically black colleges and universities.

In December 2014, the company acquired Oplink Communications, an optical networking device maker, for $445 million.

In 2015, the company joined the "Ban the Box" movement by removing questions about prior criminal convictions from its job application, making it easier for ex-offenders to find work.

In November 2015, the company "signed a Statement of Support with Employer Support of the Guard and Reserve (ESGR) that pledges Koch will provide supervisors with the tools to hire and support employees serving in the National Guard of the United States".

In 2017, the company was featured in the Forbes' list of America's Best Employers By State. It was dropped from the list in 2021.

In November 2017, Koch Disruptive Technologies was established, the corporation's venture arm, led by Chase Koch, son of Charles Koch.

In July 2019, the company sold its leases in the Athabasca oil sands.

In December 2021, Rupert Murdoch and his wife, Jerry Hall, acquired a  ranch in Beaverhead County, Montana from Matador Cattle Company, a subsidiary of the company, for $200 million. Matador was formed in 1951 by Fred Koch. It won the 2010 Lone Star Land Steward Award. The company also owns ranches in Kansas and Texas that are being marketed for sale.

Subsidiaries

Infor

Koch invested $2 billion in Infor, which focuses on cloud computing, in November 2016, another $1.5 billion in January 2019, and acquired the remainder of the company in April 2020 in a $13 billion transaction.

Arteva Europe S.a.r.l.
Arteva Europe is an "internal bank" which is headquartered in Luxembourg and manages the European cash flows of Koch Industries.

Flint Hills Resources LP
Flint Hills Resources LP, originally called Koch Petroleum Group, is a refining and chemicals company based in Wichita, Kansas. It sells gasoline, diesel, jet fuel, ethanol, polymers, intermediate chemicals, base oils and asphalt. It operates oil refineries in six states and chemical plants in Illinois, Texas and Michigan. The firm also manufactures asphalt used for paving and roofing applications at 13 asphalt terminals in six states including Alaska (2 terminals), Wisconsin (2), Iowa (3), Minnesota (4), Nebraska (1), and North Dakota (1). The firm manages the purchasing of domestic crude oil from Texas and Colorado offices, has five ethanol plants across Iowa and one in Nebraska, has a refinery terminal in Alaska, and operates refineries in Alaska, Texas, and Minnesota.

The Pine Bend Refinery in Minnesota can process  of crude oil per day, most of which comes from Alberta, Canada. It handles one quarter of all Canadian oil sands crude entering the U.S. It also operates 4 fuel terminals in Wisconsin, 6 in Texas, and one each in Iowa and Minnesota.

In 1981, it acquired a petroleum refinery in Corpus Christi, Texas from Sunoco for $265 million.

In 1994, it acquired a 104,000 b/d petroleum refinery in Corpus Christi, Texas from Kerr-McGee.

On July 16, 2014, Flint Hills Resources acquired PetroLogistics, a Houston-based manufacturer of chemical and polymer grade propylene.

Koch Pipeline Company LP
Koch Pipeline Company LP, a division of Flint Hills, owns and operates  of pipeline used to transport petroleum, natural gas liquids, and chemicals. Its pipelines are located in Wisconsin, Minnesota, Texas, Missouri, Iowa, Oklahoma, Louisiana, and Alberta, Canada. The firm has offices in Wichita, Kansas, St. Paul, Minnesota, Corpus Christi, Texas and Port Arthur, Texas.

In 1946, Wood River Oil Co. (a precursor company to Koch Industries) purchased Rock Island Oil and Refining Co. As a part of the transaction, it acquired a crude-oil pipeline in Oklahoma. As a result of construction and investments, Wood River acquired other pipelines in the US and Canada.

In 1992, it acquired United Gas Pipe Line Co., owner of 9,271 miles of pipelines.

It owns the largest interest in the Colonial Pipeline.

Georgia-Pacific

Georgia-Pacific is a paper and pulp company that manufactures a wide variety of household products under the brand names Brawny, Angel Soft, Mardi Gras, Quilted Northern, Dixie, Sparkle, and Vanity Fair. The Atlanta-based company has operations in 27 states.

Guardian Industries

Guardian Industries is an industrial manufacturer of glass, automotive, and building products based in Auburn Hills, Michigan. The company manufactures float glass, and fabricated glass products  for commercial, residential and automotive applications. The company employs more than 18,000 people and has present activities in North and South America, Europe, Asia, Africa and the Middle East.

Invista

Acquired from DuPont, Invista is a polymer and fibers company that makes "Stainmaster" carpet products, amongst many.

When the $4.4 billion deal was announced in 2003, Koch planned to make Invista a part of KoSa, its polyester business, which Koch became owner of as of November 14, 2001, after buying the 50 percent stake owned by IMASAB S.A. of Mexico.

The "Lycra" fiber brand was sold to  Shandong Ruyi Investment Holding in 2019.

Koch Ag & Energy Solutions
Koch Ag & Energy Solutions, LLC and its subsidiaries, including Koch Fertilizer, LLC, Koch Agronomic Services, LLC, Koch Energy Services, LLC and Koch Methanol, LLC, globally provide products including fertilizer and other plant nutrients for agricultural turf and ornamental plant markets, as well as other enhanced efficiency products and technology for the energy and chemical markets.

Koch Fertilizer, LLC, is one of the world's largest makers of nitrogen fertilizers. Koch Fertilizer owns or has interests in fertilizer plants in the United States, Canada, Trinidad and Tobago, Venezuela, and Italy, among others. Koch Fertilizer was formed in 1988 when the Koch companies purchased the Gulf Central Pipeline and ammonia terminals connected to the pipeline. The next year, the Koch Nitrogen Company was formed in order to market ammonia. The next few years saw purchases of various ammonia facilities in Louisiana, Canada, and elsewhere, and ammonia sales agreements with firms in Australia, the UK, and other countries. The year 2010 saw the founding of Koch Methanol, LLC, and Koch Agronomic Services, LLC. In October 2010, a plant in which Koch had a 35% stake was nationalized by the Venezuelan government. In 2011, the firm acquired the British fertilizer firm J&H Bunn Limited. Koch Fertilizer has change its name to Koch Ag and Energy Solutions (KAES)

Koch Chemical Technology Group
Koch Chemical Technology Group, Ltd. and its subsidiaries design, manufacture, install and service process and pollution control equipment, water purification and desalination equipment, and provide engineering services for various industrial applications and municipalities around the world.

Koch-Glitsch 
Koch-Glitsch is an entity of Koch Industries. Koch-Glitsch engineers mass transfer and mist elimination equipment for refineries and chemical plants around the world. As world leaders in process systems, Koch-Glitsch has two joint ventures under its umbrella: The Eta Process Plant and Koch Modular Process Systems.

Eta is the leading supplier of deaeration plants around the world, with over 400 plants worldwide. The majority of seawater deaeration plants supplied by Eta use vacuum stripping.

Koch Modular Process Systems specializes in modular mass transfer systems. Typical applications for these systems include chemical purification, solvent recovery, and liquid-liquid extraction. Koch Modular Process Systems also runs a state-of-the-art pilot plant.

Koch Minerals
Koch Minerals, LLC through its subsidiaries, is one of the world's largest managers of dry-bulk commodities, and is also involved in oil and gas exploration and production, the production of oil field products, investments in steel and other markets.

Koch Supply & Trading
Koch Supply & Trading companies around the world trade crude oil, refined petroleum products, gas liquids, natural gas, liquefied natural gas, power, renewables, emissions, and metals.

Molex
Molex produces pin-and-socket Molex connectors, specialized connectors and sensors for equipment used in data transmission, telecommunication, industrial technology, solar power, automotive, aerospace and defense, health technology, and solid-state lighting.

Environmental and safety record
Bloomberg reports that from 1999 to 2003, Koch Industries was assessed "more than $400 million in fines, penalties and judgements". Daniel Indiviglio, in a reaction piece appearing in The Atlantic, argues that the Bloomberg article is biased and misleading, asserting that the Bloomberg team "only found eight instances of alleged misconduct by a giant multinational over the span of 63 years". The eight instances mentioned by Bloomberg include:

In October, 1994, a pipeline broke and discharged over 90,000 gallons of crude oil into Gum Hollow Creek, in Refugio County, Texas. Heavy rains carried the oil to the Nueces River and on into Nueces and Corpus Christi Bays. The discharge oiled terrestrial and aquatic vegetation, birds, sediments, soils, and other biota. The Consent Decree was held up for some time, due to a DOJ criminal case with Koch Pipeline regarding non- and under-reporting of discharges. The criminal case was settled in March 2000 and the assessment completed.

In 1996, an 8-inch-diameter steel LPG pipeline operated by Koch Pipeline Company ruptured near Lively, Texas, a community about 50 miles southeast of Dallas, and began leaking butane gas. The vapor cloud ignited when two teenaged residents drove their pickup truck across a creek near the pipeline while on their way to a neighbor's house to call 9-1-1 and report the smell of gas. The two were killed in the explosion, and approximately 25 families were later evacuated from the neighborhood without injury. An investigation conducted by the NTSB found that the pipe section which failed had not been shown to have excessive corrosion in a 1995 inspection. Regulations at the time did not provide criteria for "adequate cathodic protection". In 1999, a Texas jury found that negligence had led to the rupture of the Koch pipeline and awarded the victims' families $296 million.

In March 1999, Koch Petroleum Group acknowledged that it had negligently discharged hundreds of thousands of gallons of aviation fuel into wetlands from its refinery in Rosemount, Minnesota, and that it had illegally dumped a million gallons of high-ammonia wastewater onto the ground and into the Mississippi River. Koch Petroleum paid a $6 million fine and $2 million in remediation costs, and was ordered to serve three years of probation.

In 2000, as a result of 312 oil spills attributed to Koch and its subsidiaries across six states, Koch paid what was at the time the largest civil fine ever imposed on a company under any federal environmental law for the illegal discharge of crude oil and petroleum products. Koch disputed the EPA figures, saying the EPA did not file claims in over half of the 312 alleged cases, and further, that "Many of these alleged spills are not even listed in the EPA's own oil spill data base." In a settlement with the U.S. Justice Department and the state of Texas which included "leaks that occurred as the result of third party actions, like digging," the company agreed to pay a "$30 million civil penalty, improve its leak-prevention programs and spend $5 million on environmental projects".

In September 2000, a federal grand jury returned a 97-count indictment against Koch Industries and four individual employees for environmental crimes relating to alleged violations of the Clean Air Act and the measurement and control of benzene emissions from the West Plant in Corpus Christi, Texas. A superseding indictment followed in January 2001. In April 2001, Koch pleaded guilty to one count, related to wastewater reporting it had self-reported to the government in 1995, according to the company. Koch Industries was fined $20 million, of which $10 million was a criminal fine and $10 million to be used for special projects to improve the environment in Corpus Christi.

In December 2000, the Justice Department and EPA signed a Consent Decree with Koch Petroleum Group to spend an estimated $80 million to install up-to-date pollution-control equipment at two refineries in Corpus Christi, Tex. and one near St. Paul, Minn., reducing emissions from stacks, leaking valves, wastewater vents, and flares. Koch also will pay a $4.5 million penalty to settle Clean Air Act violations and other environmental claims at its Minnesota refinery. The State of Minnesota has joined in the settlement with the United States.

In June 2003, the US Commerce Department fined Flint Hills Resources a $200,000 civil penalty. The fine settled charges that the company exported crude petroleum from the US to Canada without proper US government authorization. The Commerce Department's Bureau of Industry and Security said from July 1997 to March 1999, Koch Petroleum (later called Flint Hills Resources) committed 40 violations of Export Administration Regulations.

According to the environmental documentary, Company Town, released in 2016, improper waste disposal by the Georgia-Pacific Paper Mill in Crossett, Arkansas caused a cluster of cancer incidents in the area around the mill.

In 2004, Koch Industries bought a refinery in North Pole, Alaska that tapped the Trans-Alaska Pipeline and produced heating and jet fuels and other products. In 2006, Flint Hills Resources was fined nearly $16,000 by the EPA for 10 separate violations of the Clean Air Act at that facility, and was required to spend another $60,000 on safety equipment needed to help prevent future violations. In January 2020, after a trial that had begun in October 2019, a Fairbanks, Alaska Superior Court judge pro tem ordered Williams Alaska Petroleum, previous owner of the refinery, to pay $29.4 million for costs and damages related to contaminating drinking water wells supplying hundreds of residents with sulfolane, the problem first discovered in 2009. The judge separately ordered Williams to pay future response costs and partially reimburse Flint Hills Resources LLC for the more than $130 million it had spent to provide clean water to affected residents. The judge allocated 75% of the spill liability to Williams and 25% to Flint Hills in the trial that determined the allocation of responsibility. The Alaska Attorney General's office commented, "We're pleased that the court affirmed the basic principle that under Alaska law the polluter pays." Williams, Flint Hills and the state had been in litigation regarding the sulfolane plume for nearly a decade.

Koch Industries won the 2015 Conservation Education Award from the Wildlife Habitat Council and "has partnered with the company on conservation efforts for the past 15 years".

Political activity

Fred C. Koch was one of the organizers of the John Birch Society in 1958.

According to OpenSecrets, many of Koch Industries' contributions have gone toward achieving legislation on taxes, energy and nuclear power, defense appropriations and financial regulatory reform. Koch Industries has been criticized by the environmentalist group Greenpeace for the role they allege the company plays in affecting climate change policy in the United States.

Prior to 2008, a Canadian subsidiary of Koch Industries contributed to the Fraser Institute, a conservative Canadian public policy think tank, according to the Institute's founder.

The company has opposed the regulation of financial derivatives, limits on greenhouse gases, and sponsors free market foundations and causes.

Koch Industries has come out against Low Carbon Fuel Standards. According to Koch Industries, "LCFS would cripple refiners that rely on heavy crude feedstocks to provide the transportation fuels that keep America moving."

The Koch Industries website includes an opinion piece from The Wall Street Journal by Charles Koch, titled "Why Koch Industries is Speaking Out." The article states: "Because of our activism, we've been vilified by various groups. Despite this criticism, we're determined to keep contributing and standing up for those politicians, like Wisconsin Gov. Scott Walker, who are taking these challenges [deficit spending by governments] seriously."

The company also funds the political action committee KochPAC.

In a 2014 opinion piece in The Wall Street Journal, Charles Koch wrote about his beliefs on a free society saying, "A truly free society is based on a vision of respect for people and what they value. In a truly free society, any business that disrespects its customers will fail and deserves to do so. The same should be true of any government that disrespects its citizens. The central belief and fatal conceit of the current administration are that you are incapable of running your own life, but those in power are capable of running it for you. This is the essence of big government and collectivism."

In February 2016, Charles Koch wrote an opinion piece for The Washington Post, titled "This is the one issue where Bernie Sanders is right" in which he argued that "Democrats and Republicans have too often favored policies and regulations that pick winners and losers. This helps perpetuate a cycle of control, dependency, cronyism, and poverty in the United States."

According to watchdog group Documented, in 2020 Koch Industries contributed $375,000 to the Rule of Law Defense Fund, a fund-raising arm of the Republican Attorneys General Association.

See also

 Energy in the United States
 Koch family
 Koch family foundations
 List of largest companies by revenue
 Petrochemical industry
 Petroleum in the United States

References

Further reading

External links

 
 

 
1940 establishments in Kansas
American companies established in 1940
Companies based in Wichita, Kansas
Conglomerate companies established in 1940
Conglomerate companies of the United States
Multinational companies headquartered in the United States
Oil companies of the United States
Oil pipeline companies
Privately held companies based in Kansas
Family-owned companies of the United States